Nicholas Ferenc Deverdics (born 24 November 1987) is an English footballer who plays for National League North club Blyth Spartans as a midfielder ( ex  Left defensive player)

Career

Early career
Deverdics began his career as a trainee with Newcastle United, but was released at the end of the 2005–06 season.

Upon his release he joined Gateshead, leaving to join Bedlington Terriers in December 2006.

Promotion with Gretna to the Scottish Premier League
In March 2007 Deverdics moved to Gretna. where the then Director of Club Development Mick Wadsworth said: "Nicky's got great ability and we have high hopes for him. I have watched him a lot and he was a player who really interested us, so we're delighted to have him on board."
Deverdics made an immediate impact and played a key role in helping them to clinch promotion – playing six times and scoring once. Deverdics went on to make 26 appearances for Gretna in the Scottish Premier League. On 19 May 2008 Deverdics was one of 40 members of staff who were released by Gretna, after financial problems forced the club to disband.

Life in the Football League with Barnet
Deverdics joined Barnet in July 2008 and went on to make 51 appearances for the Bees – winning the 'Most Improved Player' award in his first season. Upon signing Deverdics, the then manager Paul Fairclough told BBC London 94.9: "He has played in the Scottish Premier. He's only 20 and has got a great left foot and has a big future." Deverdics played in a midfield alongside the likes of Yannick Bolasie, Albert Adomah and Micah Hyde.

Becoming a Spartan
On the eve of the 2010–2011 season it was announced that Deverdics had signed for Conference North side Blyth Spartans. He made his debut as a second-half substitute in the 2–0 defeat to Solihull Moors on 14 August 2010.

He scored his first goal for the Spartans on 11 September 2010 in their 3–0 home win over Worcester City.

Breaking The Ice: BÍ/Bolungarvík
Deverdics joined Icelandic team BÍ/Bolungarvík on 11 May 2011. During a 3–2 win against Thróttur Reykjavík, Deverdics scored two direct free kicks with manager Gudjón Þórdarson concluding: "Clearly he tied his laces right because they were fine goals."

Alfreton Town
Deverdics signed for Alfreton Town in February 2012. He left the club in May 2012 after his non-contract terms expired.

TB Tvøroyri
Deverdics signed for Faroese top-flight club TB Tvøroyri in March 2013. He left the club at the end of the 2013 season as TB were relegated.

Tadcaster Albion
Deverdics signed for Northern Counties East League club Tadcaster Albion in February 2014. He made his debut on 26 February in the NCEL League Cup at Eccleshill United.

Dover Athletic
Deverdics signed for Conference Premier club Dover Athletic in July 2014.

Hartlepool United
On 6 June 2016 it was announced that Deverdics had signed for Hartlepool United on a free transfer. Deverdics scored his first goal for Hartlepool in an FA Cup tie against Stamford on 6 November 2016.

Wrexham
On 31 January 2018, Deverdics signed an 18-month contract with National League side Wrexham. Deverdics scored his first goal for Wrexham in the Cross-border derby against Chester on 11 March 2018, the 2nd goal in a 2–0 win. He was released by the club on 8 May 2019.

Gateshead

On 5 August 2019, Deverdics re-joined for Gateshead.

Blyth Spartans
On 9 July 2021, Deverdics re-signed for National League North side Blyth Spartans.

Career statistics

References

External links

Nicky's Blyth Spartans A.F.C. profile

1987 births
Footballers from Newcastle upon Tyne
Living people
English people of Hungarian descent
Association football midfielders
English footballers
English expatriate footballers
Newcastle United F.C. players
Gateshead F.C. players
Bedlington Terriers F.C. players
Gretna F.C. players
Barnet F.C. players
Blyth Spartans A.F.C. players
Nicky Deverdics
Team Northumbria F.C. players
Alfreton Town F.C. players
Tvøroyrar Bóltfelag players
Tadcaster Albion A.F.C. players
Dover Athletic F.C. players
Hartlepool United F.C. players
Wrexham A.F.C. players
Expatriate footballers in Iceland
Expatriate footballers in the Faroe Islands
Scottish Football League players
Scottish Premier League players
English Football League players
National League (English football) players
Northern Premier League players
Northern Football League players